The 2010 Status Athens Open was a professional tennis tournament played on outdoor hard courts. It was part of the 2010 ATP Challenger Tour. It took place in Athens, Greece between 19 and 25 April 2010.

ATP entrants

Seeds

Rankings are as of April 12, 2010.

Other entrants
The following players received wildcards into the singles main draw:
  Theodoros Angelinos
  Benjamin Becker
  Konstantinos Economidis
  Alex Jakupovic

The following players received entry from the qualifying draw:
  Ričardas Berankis
  Andis Juška
  Miloslav Mečíř Jr.
  Noam Okun

The following players received the lucky loser spot:
  Rik de Voest
  Simon Stadler

Champions

Singles

 Lu Yen-hsun def.  Rainer Schüttler, 3–6, 7–6(4), 6–4

Doubles

 Rik de Voest /  Lu Yen-hsun def.  Robin Haase /  Igor Sijsling, 6–3, 6–4

References
2010 Draws
ITF search 

Status Athens Open
2010 in Greek tennis
Status Athens Open